Cédric Schneuwly (born May 19, 1992) is a Swiss professional ice hockey forward. He is currently playing for EHC Olten in the National League B (NLB). He formerly played with EV Zug in the Swiss top tier National League A.

Schneuwly participated at the 2012 World Junior Ice Hockey Championships as a member of the Switzerland men's national junior ice hockey team.

References

External links

1992 births
Living people
EHC Olten players
SCL Tigers players
Swiss ice hockey left wingers
EV Zug players